Volchansky Uyezd was an uyezd (district) in the Kharkov Governorate of the Russian Empire.

History 

This uyezd was created on April 25, 1780 by order of the Empress Catherine the Great. The administrative centre of uyezd was small town Volchansk. Since 1781 Volchansk got its own coat of arms.

The uyezd had one town (Volchansk) and consisted of 14 volosts.

In the 1890s, the railway was built through the uyezd and the Volchansk railway station was built in 1896 in Volchansk.

In January 1897, according to the Russian Empire Census, the population of the uyezd was 166 787 people.

By the Soviet administrative reform of 1923, the uyezd was transformed into Vovchansk Raion.

Demographics
At the time of the Russian Empire Census of 1897, Volchansky Uyezd had a population of 166,787. Of these, 74.8% spoke Ukrainian and 25.0% Russian as their native language.

References

Sources 
 Волчанск // Энциклопедический словарь Брокгауза и Ефрона : в 86 т. (82 т. и 4 доп.). — Т. 7. СПб., 1892.

Uezds of Kharkov Governorate